The Eyres skink (Oligosoma repens) is a nationally vulnerable species of skink native to New Zealand. It is named in honour of the location of its habitat, the  Eyre Mountains.

Conservation Status 

As of 2012 the Department of Conservation (DOC) classified the Eyres skink as Nationally Vulnerable under the New Zealand Threat Classification System.

References

External links 
 Holotype specimen of Oligosoma repens held at the Museum of New Zealand Te Papa Tongarewa

Oligosoma
Reptiles of New Zealand
Reptiles described in 2011
Taxa named by David G. Chapple
Taxa named by Trent Bell
Taxa named by Stephanie N.J. Chapple
Taxa named by Kimberly A. Miller
Taxa named by Geoff B. Patterson
Taxa named by Charles H. Daugherty